Maung Thura "Zarganar" (also called Zaganar, ; also Zargana); born 27 January 1961) is a popular Burmese comedian, film actor, and a film director as well as a fierce critic and often political prisoner of the Burmese military government. Known for his wicked puns against the government which is a military junta, Zarganar, whose name translates to "tweezers", is widely considered to be the most popular comedian and satirist in Myanmar.

In September 2006, Zarganar was banned indefinitely from performing publicly or participating in any kind of entertainment related work. He was arrested on 4 June 2008 for speaking to foreign media about the situation of millions of people left homeless after a cyclone devastated the Irrawaddy Delta. In November 2008, he was sentenced to 59 years in prison, convicted of "public order offenses", under four sections of the criminal code—17/2, 32 (b), 295 (a) and 505 (b), much more than the anticipated maximum of two years. On 16 February 2009, following the appeals by the family, Yangon Divisional Court reduced the prison sentence by "up to 24 years", bringing the sentence down to 35 years. In December 2008, Zarganar has been sent to Myitkyina Prison in Kachin State in the country's far north, from which he was freed on 11 October 2011 in a mass amnesty of political prisoners.

Zarganar was awarded the Lillian Hellman and Dashiell Hammett Award, given by the Fund for Free Expression, a committee organized by the New-York-based Human Rights Watch. In October 2008, Zarganar was awarded One Humanity Award by PEN Canada of which he is an honorary member.

Early life
Zarganar was born Thura (also ) in Yangon to a political and intellectual family of well-known writers Hla Kyi (who went by the pen name of Yuwaddy Kyi Oo) and Aung Thein (pen name: Nan Nyunt Swe). Thura is of Mon-Bamar descent. Thura was the youngest of three sons, brother of Wunna and Teza. The young Thura accompanied his parents on speaking tours where he used to entertain people by giving talks and doing imitations, and earned himself the nickname "Mimic".

Thura graduated from Yangon's elite State High School No. 1 Dagon in 1977 and received a degree in dental surgery from Rangoon Institute of Dental Medicine in 1985. While in dentistry school, he worked as a volunteer literacy teacher in Chin State and wrote about his experiences in a book, published by the Sape Beikman, the country's official literary publishing house.

Career
Thura first found success while still in college, performing amateur stage comedy shows at Yangon's universities under his stage name Zarganar (tweezers). He banded together with students from various colleges and institutes and formed a dance-troupe called Mya Kyun Tha. Later, he formed a drama group called Moe Nat Thuza which performed at student gatherings. Zarganar soon became a household name when his troupe began appearing on Burmese television in broadcasts of anyeint (a type of traditional Burmese theater) shows.

After completing his dentistry studies, he took to the stage full-time. In 1986, he formed the Mya Ponnama Anyeint troupe whose shows frequently appeared on television. He quickly became known for his expert ability to concoct double entendres. And his willingness to use them in farcical routines highlighting the failures of the government delighted millions of awe-struck audiences.

That all changed in 1988. Zarganar was arrested for participating in the nationwide uprising in 1988. He would be in and out of prison for next five out of six years. After his release from prison in 1994, Zarganar was prohibited from performing on stage but allowed to participate in video productions, working as producer, director, scriptwriter and actor. But his work was closely scrutinized by the censors and military intelligence, in a cat-and-mouse game in which Zarganar and his audiences took delight in sidestepping the authorities.

In 1997, Zarganar soon ran afoul with the authorities for his movie Lun, and was promptly banned for another three years from the show business. He was allowed to do films in 2000 (but still no comedy shows or stage theater).
Since May 2006, Zarganar has again been banned from the show business indefinitely, for giving an interview to the BBC.

Artistic contributions

KESKILYA Zarganar's contributions to the revival of popularity of anyeint (also spelled anyein) among the younger generations of Burmese cannot be overstated. Anyeint shows are a form of traditional theater combining dance, music and comedy that has come to play a central role in Burmese society—performed at a wide range of secular and religious events, from weddings to pagoda festivals. The shows are traditionally led by one or more female performers who dance and sing playful songs, and a troupe of comedians (usually 4 or 5) provide comic relief between the sing-dance routines of the female performers. Before Zarganar came along, the popularity of anyeint shows had been in long decline (especially in urban areas).

Zarganar helped to revitalize the art by changing the format upside down. By using humor to push the envelope against government censors, his anyeint shows generated immense interest among Burmese of all backgrounds, and in the process attracted new generations of fans to anyeint shows. Zarganar did not invent the art of using puns and double entendres, which had long been part of traditional Burmese humor but in many ways he perfected it in the Burmese language. (The tonal monosyllabic Burmese language with many homophones seemed particularly suited for double talk.) People were drawn to his vaudevillian routines filled with seemingly innocent silly banter among comedians not only because they were bitingly funny but also because they cleverly highlighted the failures of the government.

In the mid-1980s, Zarganar and his comedians were the main draw to their anyeint show. People went to see the comedians first, and the pretty female performers second. Today, Anyeint shows are still nominally led by female performers but the comedians-cum-social commentators are what most people go to see. The most popular shows are led by the comedians such as Thee-Lay-Thee who are willing to poke fun at the government.

Political activities and social work

During the 1988 uprising, Zarganar was arrested for being an "instigator" and sent to the notorious Insein Prison for a year. After his release he was arrested again during the 1990 elections for giving political speeches and sentenced to another four years in prison. (His father, also a political activist, at one point gave a speech at the home of Aung San Suu Kyi, leading to a ban by the state censors. His mother Kyi Oo was also elected as an independent candidate.) In 1991, the Fund for Free Expression, part of the Human Rights Watch organization, awarded him a Lillian Hellman and Dashiell Hammett Grant.

Soon after Cyclone Nargis devastated vast swaths of the Irrawaddy Delta in early May 2008, Zarganar organized a group of an estimated 400 Burmese involved in the entertainment industry to provide volunteer disaster relief aid in the cyclone-damaged areas. He divided the volunteers into groups of helpers, who took aid to 42 villages, some of which had until then received no help at all after the cyclone.

In January 2012, the British Foreign Secretary William Hague is due to meet Zarganar to discuss political reform as part of the first visit by a British Foreign Secretary to Burma in over fifty years.

In February 2012, Zarganar travelled to Washington, D.C. to meet US Secretary of State Hillary Clinton, to further discuss the ongoing issue of political prisoners, women’s rights, and the situation of ethnic minorities in Burma with senior officials in Myanmar.

On 6 April 2021, in the aftermath of the 2021 Myanmar coup d'état, he was arrested at his home in Yangon. Since the coup on 1 February, he had not carried out any significant political activities, and the reason for his arrest is unknown. On 18 October 2021, he was conditionally released.

List of conflicts with the government
 February 2006: The government bans a movie that Zarganar directed, Run Out of Patience.
 May 2006: Zarganar is banned from performing in the country for his interview with the BBC regarding government regulations on the thingyan water festival, and for making a television commercial suggesting Taiwanese independence.
 February 2007: A state-run newspaper the New Light of Myanmar accuses Zarganar of participating in "illegal" activities and inciting "public unrest and violence" after his speech at a debate at the American Center, a venue operated by the US embassy in Yangon.
 26 September 2007: Zarganar is arrested at his home for his participation in the ongoing anti-government protests. During the preceding two days he had, with fellow Burmese celebrity Kyaw Thu, publicly delivered food and water to Buddhist monks preparing to protest. During the preceding weekend, he had urged the public to support the monks in radio interviews from outside the country.
 4 June 2008: Special Branch police and other authorities take him from his home in connection with this work, along with a computer, VCDs and US$1000.
 21 November 2008: Zarganar is sentenced by the Court to 45 years imprisonment for violations of the Electronics Act.
 29 November 2008: Zarganar receives an additional 14 years under four sections of the criminal code—17/2, 32 (b), 295 (a) and 505 (b), bringing the total sentence to 59 years.
 16 February 2009: Following the appeals, Yangon Divisional Court reduces the prison sentence by "up to 24 years", bringing the sentence down to 35 years.
 11 (or 12) October 2011: Zarganar is released as part of a series of amnesties of political prisoners, along with labor activist Su Su Nway and 88 Generation Student Group activist Zaw Htet Ko Ko.

Awards and recognition
In 2008, Zarganar was awarded the Freedom to Create Prize for Imprisoned Artists. Amnesty International named him a prisoner of conscience and called for his immediate release. In 2009, he was awarded the inaugural PEN/Pinter Prize as an International writer of courage. In May 2011, Zarganar was awarded Honorary Life Membership in Equity, the UK performers' union, in recognition of his struggle for artistic freedom in Burma.

Zarganar has been featured in This Prison Where I Live, a documentary film by British filmmaker Rex Bloomstein and German comedian Michael Mittermeier, who had traveled secretly to Burma to make the film.

In 2009, Zarganar was awarded the inaugural PEN Pinter Prize, established in memory of Harold Pinter.  Zarganar shared the award with British poet Tony Harrison.

On 27 March 2012, Zarganar received the Prince Claus Fund Award, handed over by Dutch ambassador Joan Boers during a historic Aneyint event in the People's Square in Yangon.

Filmography

Films
Between 1985 and 1988, Zarganar starred in four films and eight video movies as the lead actor. He took on supporting actor roles in his movies since 2001. He also tried his hand at directing. In 2004, with the aid of local non-governmental organisations, Zarganar directed three short videos and a film for the purpose of raising awareness of HIV and AIDS in the country.

Videos
Direct-to-video productions on VCD intended strictly for the home market and never screened in theaters.

Da Myo Gyi Lè Phyit Tat Ba Dè
Modern Nay A Phay
Daga Khaut Than Mya
Shar-Shay Gya Thu Mya
Ta Wa-Wa Ta Ha-Ha
May-Kyan-Yit-Thaw Zatlan Da Bot
Paut Paut Myaut Myaut
Pyi Gyi Mandaing Mya Gyi (Part II)
Sanda Pinle
Bar Bar Bar Mha Ma Thi Bu (Part I)
Aye-Say Ba
Chit Chit Nè Thungegyin Hna Yauk
Zar Kanar 
Lu Kè
A-Thet Ta-Ya A-Na Ma Shi

See also

References

External links
 Recording on YouTube of radio interview with Zarganar, September 23 2007

1961 births
Amnesty International prisoners of conscience held by Myanmar
20th-century Burmese male actors
Burmese film directors
Burmese prisoners and detainees
Living people
People from Yangon
Burmese comedians
Burmese male film actors